The 1983 Sonoma State Cossacks football team represented Sonoma State University as a member of the Northern California Athletic Conference (NCAC) during the 1983 NCAA Division II football season. Led by second-year head coach Tony Kehl, Sonoma State compiled an overall record of 2–9 with a mark of 0–6 in conference play, placing last out of seven teams in the NCAC. The team was outscored by its opponents 304 to 138 for the season. The Cossacks played home games at Cossacks Stadium in Rohnert Park, California.

Schedule

Notes

References

Sonoma State
Sonoma State Cossacks football seasons
Sonoma State Cossacks football